The following is a list of 2016 box office number-one films in Italy.

References

2016
Italy
2016 in Italian cinema